The postage stamp problem is a mathematical riddle that asks what is the smallest postage value which cannot be placed on an envelope, if the latter can hold only a limited number of stamps, and these may only have certain specified face values.

For example, suppose the envelope can hold only three stamps, and the available stamp values are 1 cent, 2 cents, 5 cents, and 20 cents.  Then the solution is 13 cents; since any smaller value can be obtained with at most three stamps (e.g. 4 = 2 + 2, 8 = 5 + 2 + 1, etc.), but to get 13 cents one must use at least four stamps.

Mathematical definition
Mathematically, the problem can be formulated as follows: 
 Given an integer m and a set V of positive integers, find the smallest integer z that cannot be written as the sum v1 + v2 + ··· + vk of some number k ≤ m of (not necessarily distinct) elements of V.

Complexity
This problem can be solved by brute force search or backtracking with maximum time proportional to |V |m, where |V | is the number of distinct stamp values allowed.  Therefore, if the capacity of the envelope m is fixed, it is a polynomial time problem.  If the capacity m is arbitrary, the problem is known to be NP-hard.

See also
 Coin problem
 Knapsack problem
 Subset sum problem

References

External links

 

 
 

Additive number theory
Recreational mathematics
Applied mathematics
Mathematical problems